Dean Joseph Norris (born April 8, 1963)  is an American actor. He is best known for playing DEA agent Hank Schrader on the AMC series Breaking Bad (2008–2013) and its spin-off Better Call Saul (2020). He also portrayed town councilman James "Big Jim" Rennie on the CBS series Under the Dome (2013–2015) and played mob boss Clay "Uncle Daddy" Husser on the TNT series Claws (2017-2022).  Throughout his career, Norris has acted in nearly 50 movies and more than 100 different TV shows.

Norris has appeared in films such as Lethal Weapon 2 (1989), Hard to Kill (1990), Total Recall (1990), Terminator 2: Judgment Day (1991), The Firm (1993), Starship Troopers (1997), The Cell (2000), Little Miss Sunshine (2006), Evan Almighty (2007), and Sons of Liberty (2015), and has more recently starred in films such as The Book of Henry (2017), Death Wish (2018), and Scary Stories to Tell in the Dark (2019).

Early life
Dean Joseph Norris was born in South Bend, Indiana. He graduated from Clay High School in 1981, where he was the class valedictorian. While in high school, he was a member of the award-winning student-produced comedy show Beyond Our Control, which ran on WNDU-TV. He is a 1985 graduate of Harvard College, where he studied the interdisciplinary concentration of Social Studies and was a member of Hasty Pudding Theatricals. He also earned a diploma from the Royal Academy of Dramatic Art in 1987.

Career
Norris starred in Tremors: The Series and the film Without Limits. He has had guest spots in other television series including NYPD Blue, The X-Files, The West Wing, and Lost, and has appeared in films including Gattaca and Terminator 2: Judgment Day. He played Drug Enforcement Administration (DEA) agent Hank Schrader on Breaking Bad from the show's premiere in 2008 to its final season in 2013. Norris' performance on Breaking Bad has received critical acclaim.

Norris also starred in the CBS series Under the Dome. He plays selectman James "Big Jim" Rennie, the only town council member in the area which is cut off from the rest of the United States. As of June 2017, he plays mob boss Clay "Uncle Daddy" Husser in the TNT series Claws.

In 2020, Norris reprised the role of Agent Hank Schrader on-screen in the Breaking Bad prequel Better Call Saul during the show's fifth season.

Norris was cast in a lead role for the CBS sitcom United States of Al.

Personal life
Norris and his wife, Bridget, a former entertainment attorney, live with their five children in Temecula, California. In 2018, the couple opened the Norris Performing Arts Center in Murrieta.

Norris was accused of sexually assaulting a 32-year-old woman from Ohio, in June 2017 in New Orleans. However, in February 2018, the New Orleans police declined to charge him, citing "insufficient evidence."

Norris is a fan of his hometown team the Notre Dame Fighting Irish.

In 2019, he helped launch Schraderbräu, Hank Schrader's in-universe home-brewed craft beer, as an official product.

In 2022, Dean and Bridget Norris purchased The Swing Inn Cafe, a long-standing restaurant in Old Town, Temecula, for $6 million.

Filmography

Film

Television

Awards and nominations

References

External links

 
 Dean Norris discusses Breaking Bad at AMCtv.com

1963 births
20th-century American male actors
21st-century American male actors
Actors from South Bend, Indiana
Alumni of RADA
American male television actors
American male film actors
American people of English descent
American people of Hungarian descent
American people of Scottish descent
Harvard College alumni
Living people
Male actors from Indiana